Rainier High School, located in Rainier, Washington, United States, was established in 1909. As of the 2009–2010 school year, it provides instruction for approximately 300 students in grades 9–12 with a staff of about 20 full-time and part-time instructors.  The school was named a 2007 Washington State School of Distinction based on its dramatically improved WASL scores. Its mascot is the Mountaineer and the school colors are orange and black. The current principal is John Beckman.

Athletics
The Rainier Boys Track and Field team won the school's first ever team championship in 2022, led by University of Texas commit Jeremiah Nubbe, who won both the Shot Put and Discus at state.

Notable alumni
Eloy Perez, '06 - professional boxer
Chad Forcier, '91 - Assistant Coach for the Milwaukee Bucks

References

External links
Rainier High School website
Rainier School District website

High schools in Thurston County, Washington
Public high schools in Washington (state)
Educational institutions established in 1909
1909 establishments in Washington (state)